Jakob Hlasek and John McEnroe were the defending champions but this time Hlasek played in pair with Frenchman Guy Forget and lost in the second round to Australians Mark Woodforde and Todd Woodbridge.

It was all-American final with Jim Grabb and Patrick McEnroe beating Rick Leach and Jim Pugh, 7–6, 4–6, 6–3.

Seeds
Text in italics indicates the round in which the seeded pairs were eliminated.

 Rick Leach /  Jim Pugh (runners-up)
 Guy Forget /  Jakob Hlasek (quarterfinal)
 Grant Connell /  Glenn Michibata (quarterfinal)
 none

Draw

External links

Wembley Championships
1990 ATP Tour